Elders, in Indigenous North American cultures, are repositories of cultural and philosophical knowledge within their tribal communities, as well as the transmitters of this storehouse of information. They are regarded as living libraries, with information on a wide variety of practical, spiritual and ceremonial topics, including "basic beliefs and teachings, encouraging...faith in the Great Spirit, the Creator". "The fact acknowledged in most Indian societies: Certain individuals, by virtue of qualifications and knowledge, are recognized by the Indian communities as the ultimately qualified reservoirs of aboriginal skills." The role of elder is featured within and without classrooms, conferences, ceremonies, and homes.

The following definition is from a study of the role in one community by Roderick Mark at the University of Calgary:

The following definition from a curriculum guide in Edmonton outlines one context of learning:

The importance of context is indicated by the "specialization" of elders knowledge: "The elders' skills are activated in contextual situations to meet specific needs." As well as by the need for preparation in classroom settings: "'People responsible for the hiring of older Indians as resource people make the mistake of merely putting them in a classroom with young children. The elders want to tell stories as they used to but children are either too impatient to listen, or perhaps do not understand.'"

The importance of context and preparation is also indicated by the following quote: "For example, recent work with the Menominee indicated that eye contact between an elder teacher and a child was necessary for informal teaching to proceed, and any disruption on the part of the child was challenged (Medicine, unpublished field notes 1987). Similarly, I have heard Lakota (Sioux) parents state, 'Look me in the eyes!' when addressing children and grandchildren."

Politically elders may be accorded a weak position. At conferences elders may be treated as tokens and simply be brought out at the beginning and end to lead ceremonies. In classrooms elders may be unpaid or underpaid.

See also
Oral history
Reincarnation#Ho-Chunk

Sources

Oral tradition
Traditional knowledge
Elder
Elder
American spiritual teachers